Vimmy Bhatt is an Indian actress and a trained Bharatanatyam dancer. She is known for her work in the Gujarati Sitcom Aa Family Comedy Che which aired on Colors Gujarati.

Life And Career
Vimmy was a Semi Finalist in the Femina Miss India Beauty Contest, 2002. She made her Television Debut by landing the role of 'Jwala' in the TV Series Dharti Ka Veer Yodha Prithviraj Chauhan in 2006, broadcast on Star Plus In 2013, Bhatt starred as a differently abled character (Shikha) in the short film "SPEECHLESS" by team postmasters, following the success of which, in 2016,  she made her feature film debut with the Gujarati film Hardik Abhinandan, she followed it up with a starring role in the 2018 short film "BLINK" which was nominated for "Best International Short Film" & "Best Science Fiction Short" at the Philip K. Dick Science Fiction Film Festival (2019).

Vimmy's upcoming Gujarati feature films are AASHA and BETI which were scheduled for a 2021 release.

Aside from Films and TV Series, Bhatt has appeared in video ad campaigns for Chevrolet(2013), Indian Tea Brands & print ad campaigns for Shoppers Stop, besides penning editorials and conceptual articles for New Woman (magazine).

Television

Filmography

Awards

 Vimmi was nominated by viewers as 'Favorite Bahu' for her role of Sucharita in "Tari Ankh No Afini" and 'Favorite Beti' for Disha Shashtri in "Aa Family Comedy Che" on Times of India.

Books Published
 THE REVERSAL THOUGHT PROCESS-Mind your Mind.
 THE UNKNOWN LOVE-Complicated.

References

 TV actress Vimmy Bhatt to debut in Gujarati film - Times of India
 Vimmy Bhatt says no to saas bahu sagas, opts for a Gujarati TV show - Times of India
 Actresses who sizzled on Gujarati prime time

Indian television actresses
Living people
Year of birth missing (living people)
Indian film actresses
Actresses in Gujarati cinema
Actresses from Gujarat